Lucinda Sewer Millin (August 26, 1892 – January 26, 1981) was an educator and legislator of the United States Virgin Islands. She studied in Antigua and began teaching in 1910 at a Moravian Church school. In 1923 she founded her own school. In 1954 she became the first woman elected to the Legislature of the Virgin Islands and she would serve ten years. In addition to education she had a strong interest in care for the elderly and the Lucinda Millin Home for the Aged was named for her.

References 

1892 births
1981 deaths
United States Virgin Islands women in politics
United States Virgin Islands people of African descent
Senators of the Legislature of the United States Virgin Islands
United States Virgin Islands educators
Democratic Party of the Virgin Islands politicians
American women educators
20th-century American politicians
20th-century American women politicians